Tamaurice William "Tee" Higgins (born January 18, 1999) is an American football wide receiver for the Cincinnati Bengals of the National Football League (NFL). He played college football at Clemson, where he won the 2019 College Football Playoff National Championship as a sophomore, and was drafted by the Bengals with the 33rd overall pick in the 2020 NFL Draft.

Early years
Higgins attended Oak Ridge High School in Oak Ridge, Tennessee. As a senior, he had 68 receptions for 1,044 yards and 18 touchdowns. A five star recruit, Higgins originally committed to the University of Tennessee to play college football before changing to Clemson University.

Higgins also played basketball in high school and was offered scholarships to play college basketball by numerous schools.

College career
As a freshman at Clemson in 2017, Higgins played in 13 games and had 17 receptions for 345 yards and two touchdowns.

Higgins entered his sophomore season in 2018 as a starter. In the College Football Playoff National Championship, he had three receptions for 81 yards in the 44–16 victory over Alabama.  He finished with 59 receptions for 936 receiving yards and 12 receiving touchdowns.

In his junior season, Higgins had 1,167 receiving yards and 13 touchdowns as his team finished with a 14–1 record, making it all the way to the National Championship, which Clemson lost to LSU by a score of 42–25. Higgins had a 36-yard rushing touchdown and caught 3 passes for 52 yards in the game. Higgins decided to forgo his final year of eligibility and declare for the 2020 NFL Draft.

Collegiate statistics

Professional career

In the 2020 NFL Draft, Higgins was selected by the Cincinnati Bengals in the second round with the 33rd overall pick. On July 28, 2020, Higgins signed his rookie deal, a four-year contract worth $8.6 million.

2020

Higgins made his NFL debut in Week 1 of the 2020 season against the Los Angeles Chargers. In Week 2, he recorded his first three professional receptions for 35 yards against the Cleveland Browns on Thursday Night Football. In Week 3, against the Philadelphia Eagles, Higgins had five receptions for 40 yards and his first two professional receiving touchdowns in the 23–23 tie. In Week 6 against the Indianapolis Colts, he had six receptions for 125 receiving yards in the 31–27 loss. In Week 10 against the Pittsburgh Steelers, he had seven receptions for 115 receiving yards and one receiving touchdown during the 36–10 loss.

Higgins finished his rookie season with 67 receptions for 908 yards and six receiving touchdowns. His 67 catches tied a Bengals rookie record set by Cris Collinsworth in 1981. The record would end up being broken the following year by rookie wide receiver Ja'Marr Chase, with 81 receptions. His 908 receiving yards ranked him third among all rookie receivers in 2020.

2021

In Week 12, against the Pittsburgh Steelers, Higgins had six receptions for 114 receiving yards and a touchdown in the 41–10 victory. In the following game, he had nine receptions for 138 yards and a touchdown in the 41–22 to the Los Angeles Chargers. In Week 16, against the Baltimore Ravens, he had 12 receptions for 194 receiving yards and two receiving touchdowns in the 41–21 victory. Higgins finished the 2021 regular season with 74 receptions for 1,091 yards and six receiving touchdowns in 14 games played, improving upon his rookie season. In the Divisional Round against the Tennessee Titans, Higgins recorded 7 receptions for 96 yards in the 19–16 win. In the AFC Championship Game against the Kansas City Chiefs, Higgins caught six passes for 103 yards, leading the Bengals in receiving yards in the 27–24 overtime win to advance to Super Bowl LVI.

In Super Bowl LVI, Higgins scored the Bengals' first touchdown of the game, a 6-yard pass from Joe Mixon. On the first play from scrimmage of the second half, Higgins scored a 75-yard touchdown pass, his second touchdown of the game. Higgins finished the game catching four passes for 100 yards, the most receiving yards by a player on either team in the 23–20 loss.

2022

In Week 1 against the Pittsburgh Steelers, Higgins left the game in the second quarter with a concussion. In Week 4 against the Miami Dolphins, Higgins had seven receptions for 124 yards, including a touchdown. In Week 11, against the Pittsburgh Steelers, he had nine receptions for 148 receiving yards in the 37–30 victory. In the following game against the Tennessee Titans, he had seven receptions for 114 yards and a touchdown in the 20–16 victory. In Week 16 against the New England Patriots, he had eight receptions for 128 receiving yards and one receiving touchdown in the 22–18 victory.

In a Week 17 game against the Buffalo Bills, after making a catch near midfield, Higgins was tackled by Damar Hamlin. After the play, Hamlin stood up and immediately fell backwards to the ground. First responders initiated CPR and administered defibrillation on the field. The game was ultimately postponed and cancelled. Higgins, distraught and guilt-ridden by his involvement in the play that caused Hamlin to collapse, kept in touch with the latter and his family as he recovered and exchanged prayers with them. Following the incident, donations to a charity Higgins supported increased rapidly in support of Hamlin.

Higgins finished the 2022 season with 74 receptions for 1,029 receiving yards and seven receiving touchdowns. He had six receptions for 83 yards and a touchdown in the 23–20 loss to the Kansas City Chiefs in the AFC Championship.

NFL career statistics

Regular season

Postseason

References

External links

Cincinnati Bengals bio
Clemson Tigers bio

1999 births
Living people
21st-century African-American sportspeople
African-American players of American football
American football wide receivers
Cincinnati Bengals players
Clemson Tigers football players
People from Oak Ridge, Tennessee
Players of American football from Tennessee